Denys Volodymyrovych Starchenko (born 18 July 1994) is a Ukrainian professional footballer who plays as a goalkeeper.

References

External links
 
 
 

1994 births
Living people
People from Hlukhiv
Ukrainian footballers
Association football goalkeepers
FC Barsa Sumy players
FC Enerhiya Nova Kakhovka players
MFC Mykolaiv players
MFC Mykolaiv-2 players
FC Krystal Kherson players
FC Cherkashchyna players
FC Dnipro Cherkasy players
FC Kremin Kremenchuk players
Ukrainian First League players
Ukrainian Second League players
Sportspeople from Sumy Oblast